Darshan Mondal (7 June 1940 – 29 May 1971) was an Indian gymnast. He competed in eight events at the 1964 Summer Olympics.

References

External links
 

1940 births
1971 deaths
Indian male artistic gymnasts
Olympic gymnasts of India
Gymnasts at the 1964 Summer Olympics
Place of birth missing